St. Paul Cathedral is the mother church of the Roman Catholic Diocese of Saint Paul, Alberta. The cathedral is located in St. Paul, Alberta on Alberta Highway 29 near downtown.  The current rector of the cathedral is Rev. Andrew Schoenberger. Services are conducted in both French and English. The church has been the seat of the bishop of the diocese since its formation on August 7, 1948. The parish associated with the church has been in existence since 1859.

On May 9, 2014, John Carlos Quadro, a St. Paul resident, showed up at the Cathedral Rectory and when Father Gilbert Dasna SMMM answered the door, Quadro shot the priest 5 times then dashed into his truck, leaving the priest alone where he succumbed to his injuries.

Gallery

References

External links
Official website
GCatholic.org

Roman Catholic churches in Alberta
Roman Catholic cathedrals in Alberta
County of St. Paul No. 19